Dorothy Renée Ascherson (19 May 1915 – 30 October 2014), known professionally as Renée Asherson, was an English actress. Much of her theatrical career was spent in Shakespearean plays, appearing at such venues as the Old Vic, the Liverpool Playhouse, and the Westminster Theatre. Her first stage appearance was on 17 October 1935, aged 20, and her first major film appearance was in The Way Ahead (1944). Her last film appearance was in The Others (2001).

Early life
Dorothy Renée Ascherson was born in Kensington, London, the younger daughter of shipowner Charles Stephen Ascherson (1877–1945) and Dorothy Lilian (1881–1975). Her father was of German-Jewish extraction. She was brought up in Gerrards Cross, Buckinghamshire, as well as Switzerland and Anjou. She later trained for the stage at the Webber Douglas Academy of Dramatic Art.

Career

Theatre
Asherson made her first stage appearance on 17 October 1935, as a walk-on in John Gielgud's production of Romeo and Juliet, though she was also the second understudy for Juliet. It was the production in which Gielgud and Laurence Olivier alternated the roles of Romeo and Mercutio. For eighteen months from 1937 through 1938, Asherson was a member of the Birmingham Repertory Theatre company. She first appeared at The Old Vic in May 1940 as Iris in The Tempest. Asherson toured with the Old Vic company from 1940 through 1941 in the roles of Kate Hardcastle in She Stoops to Conquer, Maria in Twelfth Night, Nerissa in The Merchant of Venice, and Blanche in King John.  Asherson appeared at the New Theatre as Blanche in July 1941 before resuming her tour with the Old Vic company.

Asherson appeared at other venues. It was at the Westminster Theatre that she gained especially good notices for her appearance in Walter Greenwood's The Cure for Love in 1945 with Robert Donat. Laurence Olivier wanted her to join his company at The Old Vic, but she chose to continue working with Donat instead. At the Aldwych Theatre, she played Beatrice to Donat's Benedict in Much Ado About Nothing in 1947 and Stella in the first London production of A Streetcar Named Desire in 1949. The latter production was directed by Olivier, with Vivien Leigh as Blanche.

She also performed at the Apollo Theatre in 1956, the Criterion Theatre also in 1956, St Martin's Theatre in 1962, the Savoy Theatre in 1963 and 1977 and the York Theatre Royal in 1973 and 1976.

Film
An early lead role for Asherson was as King Henry V's love interest, Princess Katherine, in Laurence Olivier's film of Shakespeare's play Henry V.

On film, Donat and Asherson reprised their stage roles in The Cure for Love (1949) in Donat's only film as director. During its production, the couple fell in love. They frequently appeared together in later films, such as The Magic Box (1951). In 1945 she appeared in The Way to the Stars as Iris Winterton, the love interest of Peter Penrose (John Mills).

Her final film role was as the unnamed old woman in the haunted house thriller The Others.

Television
In 1976, she played the tragic Miss Gailey over seven episodes of ATV's epic dramatisation of Arnold Bennett's "Clayhanger" opposite Janet Suzman and Denis Quilley. In 1978, she portrayed Mother Ancilla in the Armchair Thriller adaptation of the Antonia Fraser novel Quiet as a Nun, and appeared as Mrs Wainwright in the 1979 TV miniseries A Man Called Intrepid. In 1981, Asherson played the role of Sylvia Ashburton in the first season and for eight episodes of Tenko. As the character Emily Simpson, she was the first victim to die in the TV series Midsomer Murders (‘The Killings at Badger’s Drift’; S1/01,1997).

Personal life
In 1953 she moved to 8 The Grove, Highgate upon her marriage to fellow actor Robert Donat, separating before his death five years later. She never remarried and died in Primrose Hill, London on 30 October 2014, aged 99. Among her surviving relatives is her nephew, the journalist Neal Ascherson.

Filmography

References

External links

 Selected stage performances in University of Bristol Theatre Archive
Renee Asherson(Aveleyman)

1915 births
2014 deaths
Actresses from London
Alumni of the Webber Douglas Academy of Dramatic Art
English film actresses
English stage actresses
English people of German-Jewish descent
English television actresses
People from Gerrards Cross
English Shakespearean actresses